WCNP is a radio station licensed to Baraboo, Wisconsin broadcasting on 89.5 MHz FM.  The station airs a format consisting of Christian talk and teaching, Classical music and traditional Christian music, and serves the areas of Madison, Wisconsin Dells and Portage, Wisconsin.  WCNP is owned by Liberty and Freedom Inc.

References

External links
Official website

CNP
Baraboo, Wisconsin